Edward F. Porter (September 14, 1858 – February 7, 1915) was an American politician who, as a member of the North Dakota Republican Party, served as North Dakota's 4th Secretary of State from 1901 to 1906.

Edward F. Porter first won election in 1900 and was re-elected in 1902 and 1904. He did not seek re-election in 1906 and left the office after serving three terms—the first North Dakota Secretary of State to do so. Prior to his election to the statewide office, Porter served in the North Dakota House of Representatives from 1895 to 1898, and in the North Dakota Senate from 1899 to 1900.

Notes

Republican Party members of the North Dakota House of Representatives
Republican Party North Dakota state senators
Secretaries of State of North Dakota
1858 births
1915 deaths
Place of birth missing
Place of death missing
19th-century American politicians